Chiaravalle is a comune (municipality) in the Province of Ancona in the Italian region Marche, located about  west of Ancona.

The municipality of Chiaravalle contains the frazione (subdivision) Grancetta.

Chiaravalle borders the following municipalities: Camerata Picena, Falconara Marittima, Jesi, Monte San Vito, Montemarciano.

Demographic evolution

Notable people 
 Clio Maria Bittoni, Italian jurist and former First Lady of Italy
 Maria Montessori, Italian physician and educator
 Sofia Raffaeli, Italian rhythmic gymnast

References

External links 
 www.comune.chiaravalle.an.it

Cities and towns in the Marche